Tomas Leach is a British filmmaker and cinematographer known for his work on documentary features.

Early life 
Leach was born in Exeter, England. He studied at the Arts University Bournemouth before taking a scholarship at the Fabrica Research Centre.

Career 
After directing short documentaries and commercials, Leach directed his first feature documentary In No Great Hurry: 13 Lessons in Life with Saul Leiter (2013) about photographer Saul Leiter. It made the Seattle Times top ten list of 2014.

In 2016 he directed The Lure, a feature documentary about the hunt for Forrest Fenn's treasure.

In 2017 he directed Through the Darkness, a film about the baseball team at San Quentin Prison for the series Religion of Sports. The film was executive produced by Tom Brady, Michael Strahan and Gotham Chopra.

His short film, Alba: Not Everyone Will Be Taken Into the Future, premiered at the Reykjavik Film Festival in 2018.

Filmography

References

External links

Year of birth missing (living people)
Living people
British documentary filmmakers
British film directors